Charles Bunker Swain  was an American politician who served as a member of the Massachusetts House of Representatives in 1877.

References

Republican Party members of the Massachusetts House of Representatives
People from Nantucket, Massachusetts
19th-century American politicians
Year of birth missing
Year of death missing